David James Hagen (5 May 1973 – 24 July 2020) was a Scottish professional footballer.

Playing career

Hagen began his career with Rangers, where he played 20 competitive games, before moving to Hearts.

He then moved to hometown team Falkirk. He stayed for five years, making over 100 appearances for the Bairns including the 1997 Scottish Cup final. He scored the only goal in the 1997 Scottish Challenge Cup Final win against Queen of the South F.C.

He then joined Livingston, where he won the Scottish First Division title. He joined Clyde in 2001, and scored the fastest goal of the 2001-02 season, scoring after only 16 seconds against Raith Rovers.

Hagen joined Peterhead in 2004. This was to be his last senior club, before he joined junior side Bo'ness United in 2006, where he played for a year before retiring.

Death

In July 2018, it was reported that Hagen was suffering from motor neuron disease. He died of the illness on 24 July 2020, aged 47.

References

External links

1973 births
2020 deaths
Scottish footballers
Rangers F.C. players
Heart of Midlothian F.C. players
Falkirk F.C. players
Livingston F.C. players
Clyde F.C. players
Peterhead F.C. players
Scottish Football League players
Association football midfielders
Footballers from Edinburgh
Bo'ness United F.C. players
Scotland under-21 international footballers
Neurological disease deaths in Scotland
Deaths from motor neuron disease